Đuro Jandrić (born 30 October 1983) is a Serbian football defender.

References

External links
 
 

1983 births
Living people
Footballers from Belgrade
Association football defenders
Serbian footballers
FK Zemun players
FK Pelister players
FK Javor Ivanjica players
FK Srem players
FK Voždovac players
Serbian SuperLiga players
Serbian expatriate footballers
Serbian expatriate sportspeople in Greece
Serbian expatriate sportspeople in Albania
Expatriate footballers in Greece
Expatriate footballers in Albania
Kategoria Superiore players
KF Elbasani players
Vyzas F.C. players